

Offseason
Bill Veeck attempted to purchase the Phillies in late 1943. Veeck's plan was to sign players from the Negro leagues to make the Phillies competitive.

The organization held a fan contest prior to the 1944 season to solicit a second nickname for the Phillies. Fans voted on Blue Jays and Elizabeth Crooks designed a logo of a blue jay perched on the Phillies word mark.

Regular season 
The Phillies got off to a 12–6 start, and on May 13 were 1.5 games out of first place. However, it was all downhill from there, as they finished with yet another losing season.

Season standings

Record vs. opponents

Game log 

|- style="background:#bfb"
| 1 || April 18 || Dodgers || 4–1 || Dick Barrett (1–0) || Hal Gregg (0–1) || None || 11,910 || 1–0
|- style="background:#fbb"
| 2 || April 19 || Dodgers || 4–5 (10) || Bob Chipman (1–0) || Deacon Donahue (0–1) || None || 2,578 || 1–1
|- style="background:#fbb"
| 3 || April 20 || Dodgers || 2–8 || Fritz Ostermueller (1–0) || Charley Schanz (0–1) || None || 3,058 || 1–2
|- style="background:#bbb"
| – || April 21 || @ Braves || colspan=6 | Postponed (rain); Makeup: April 23 as a traditional double-header
|- style="background:#bfb"
| 4 || April 22 || @ Braves || 3–2 || Ken Raffensberger (1–0) || Al Javery (0–2) || None || 3,384 || 2–2
|- style="background:#fbb"
| 5 || April 23 (1) || @ Braves || 0–5 || Jim Tobin (1–1) || Dick Barrett (1–1) || None || see 2nd game || 2–3
|- style="background:#bfb"
| 6 || April 23 (2) || @ Braves || 3–0 || Al Gerheauser (1–0) || Nate Andrews (0–1) || None || 13,806 || 3–3
|- style="background:#bfb"
| 7 || April 25 || Giants || 4–3 (12) || Charley Schanz (1–1) || Harry Feldman (0–1) || None || 3,045 || 4–3
|- style="background:#bbb"
| – || April 27 ||Giants || colspan=6 | Postponed (rain); Makeup: July 14
|- style="background:#fbb"
| 8 || April 28 || Braves || 1–2 (11) || Nate Andrews (1–1) || Dick Barrett (1–2) || None || 3,026 || 4–4
|- style="background:#bfb"
| 9 || April 29 || Braves || 6–3 || Ken Raffensberger (2–0) || Red Barrett (0–3) || None || 5,581 || 5–4
|- style="background:#bfb"
| 10 || April 30 (1) || Braves || 2–1 (14) || Chet Covington (1–0) || Al Javery (0–3) || None || see 2nd game || 6–4
|- style="background:#fffdd0"
| 11 || April 30 (2) || Braves || 2–2 || None || None || None || 30,392 || 6–4–1
|-

|- style="background:#bfb"
| 12 || May 2 || @ Giants || 5–2 || Charley Schanz (2–1) || Bill Voiselle (3–1) || None || 2,268 || 7–4–1
|- style="background:#bfb"
| 13 || May 3 || @ Giants || 7–1 || Bill Lee (1–0) || Ace Adams (1–2) || None || 4,145 || 8–4–1
|- style="background:#bfb"
| 14 || May 5 || @ Dodgers || 3–1 || Ken Raffensberger (3–0) || Curt Davis (2–1) || None || 7,801 || 9–4–1
|- style="background:#fbb"
| 15 || May 6 || @ Dodgers || 1–10 || Hal Gregg (3–2) || Dick Barrett (1–3) || None || 9,119 || 9–5–1
|- style="background:#bbb"
| – || May 7 (1) || @ Dodgers || colspan=6 | Postponed (rain); Makeup: June 7
|- style="background:#bbb"
| – || May 7 (2) || @ Dodgers || colspan=6 | Postponed (rain); Makeup: August 30
|- style="background:#bfb"
| 16 || May 10 || @ Cubs || 7–1 || Al Gerheauser (2–0) || Bill Fleming (0–3) || None || 3,256 || 10–5–1
|- style="background:#fbb"
| 17 || May 11 || @ Cubs || 3–5 || Ed Hanyzewski (1–3) || Dick Barrett (1–4) || None || 3,878 || 10–6–1
|- style="background:#bfb"
| 18 || May 12 || @ Cubss || 9–3 || Charley Schanz (3–1) || Paul Derringer (0–5) || None || 3,738 || 11–6–1
|- style="background:#bfb"
| 19 || May 13 || @ Cubs || 6–2 || Bill Lee (2–0) || Hank Wyse (1–4) || None || 3,469 || 12–6–1
|- style="background:#fbb"
| 20 || May 14 (1) || @ Cardinals || 3–6 || Mort Cooper (2–2) || Ken Raffensberger (3–1) || None || see 2nd game || 12–7–1
|- style="background:#fbb"
| 21 || May 14 (2) || @ Cardinals || 0–1 || Red Munger (3–1) || Al Gerheauser (2–1) || None || 12,170 || 12–8–1
|- style="background:#fbb"
| 22 || May 15 || @ Cardinals || 6–11 || Harry Gumbert (2–1) || Dick Barrett (1–5) || Freddy Schmidt (1) || 1,173 || 12–9–1
|- style="background:#bfb"
| 23 || May 16 || @ Cardinals || 6–5 || Charley Schanz (4–1) || Max Lanier (5–1) || None || 10,159 || 13–9–1
|- style="background:#fbb"
| 24 || May 17 || @ Reds || 5–6 (8) || Bob Malloy (1–0) || Deacon Donahue (0–2) || None || 1,212 || 13–10–1
|- style="background:#bfb"
| 25 || May 18 || @ Reds || 2–0 || Ken Raffensberger (4–1) || Bucky Walters (5–2) || None || 10,253 || 14–10–1
|- style="background:#fbb"
| 26 || May 19 || @ Reds || 5–7 || Clyde Shoun (3–1) || Dick Barrett (1–6) || None || 1,450 || 14–11–1
|- style="background:#fbb"
| 27 || May 20 || @ Pirates || 3–4 || Nick Strincevich (4–0) || Al Gerheauser (2–2) || None || 4,096 || 14–12–1
|- style="background:#fbb"
| 28 || May 21 (1) || @ Pirates || 3–4 || Max Butcher (3–2) || Charley Schanz (4–2) || None || see 2nd game || 14–13–1
|- style="background:#bfb"
| 29 || May 21 (2) || @ Pirates || 9–4 || Dick Barrett (2–6) || Xavier Rescigno (1–4) || None || 23,009 || 15–13–1
|- style="background:#fbb"
| 30 || May 24 || Cubs || 0–2 || Paul Erickson (1–0) || Ken Raffensberger (4–2) || None || 9,945 || 15–14–1
|- style="background:#bbb"
| – || May 25 || Cubs || colspan=6 | Postponed (rain); Makeup: August 1 as a traditional double-header
|- style="background:#fbb"
| 31 || May 26 || Cubs || 1–9 || Paul Derringer (2–5) || Al Gerheauser (2–3) || None || 2,763 || 15–15–1
|- style="background:#bbb"
| – || May 27 || Pirates || colspan=6 | Postponed (rain); Makeup: July 20 as a traditional double-header
|- style="background:#fbb"
| 32 || May 28 (1) || Pirates || 0–4 || Rip Sewell (6–2) || Charley Schanz (4–3) || None || see 2nd game || 15–16–1
|- style="background:#bfb"
| 33 || May 28 (2) || Pirates || 8–2 || Dick Barrett (3–6) || Nick Strincevich (4–2) || None || 22,773 || 16–16–1
|- style="background:#fbb"
| 34 || May 29 || Pirates || 2–3 (11) || Xavier Rescigno (3–4) || Ken Raffensberger (4–3) || None || 14,438 || 16–17–1
|- style="background:#fbb"
| 35 || May 30 (1) || Reds || 3–4 || Arnold Carter (1–0) || Bill Lee (2–1) || Ed Heusser (1) || see 2nd game || 16–18–1
|- style="background:#fbb"
| 36 || May 30 (2) || Reds || 4–7 || Clyde Shoun (4–1) || Al Gerheauser (2–4) || None || 21,556 || 16–19–1
|- style="background:#bfb"
| 37 || May 31 || Reds || 5–4 || Charley Schanz (5–3) || Bob Ferguson (0–3) || None || 2,983 || 17–19–1
|-

|- style="background:#bfb"
| 38 || June 1 || Reds || 8–7 || Dick Barrett (4–6) || Tommy de la Cruz (2–4) || Bill Lee (1) || 4,306 || 18–19–1
|- style="background:#fbb"
| 39 || June 2 || Cardinals || 3–9 || Mort Cooper (4–3) || Ken Raffensberger (4–4) || None || 20,339 || 18–20–1
|- style="background:#fbb"
| 40 || June 3 || Cardinals || 3–5 || Al Jurisich (3–4) || Al Gerheauser (2–5) || None || 5,840 || 18–21–1
|- style="background:#fbb"
| 41 || June 4 (1) || Cardinals || 2–4 || Harry Gumbert (3–2) || Charley Schanz (5–4) || Red Munger (1) || see 2nd game || 18–22–1
|- style="background:#bfb"
| 42 || June 4 (2) || Cardinals || 1–0 || Bill Lee (3–1) || Freddy Schmidt (0–1) || None || 23,313 || 19–22–1
|- style="background:#bbb"
| – || June 6 || @ Dodgers || colspan=6 | Postponed (D-Day); Makeup: June 8 as a traditional double-header
|- style="background:#bfb"
| 43 || June 7 || @ Dodgers || 6–5 || Ken Raffensberger (5–4) || Rube Melton (2–4) || Charley Schanz (1) || 4,434 || 20–22–1
|- style="background:#fbb"
| 44 || June 8 (1) || @ Dodgers || 3–6 || Les Webber (2–3) || Dick Barrett (4–7) || None || see 2nd game || 20–23–1
|- style="background:#fbb"
| 45 || June 8 (2) || @ Dodgers || 1–8 || Ed Head (1–0) || Al Gerheauser (2–6) || None || 1,123 || 20–24–1
|- style="background:#bbb"
| – || June 10 || @ Giants || colspan=6 | Postponed (weather, rain); Makeup: September 12 as a traditional double-header
|- style="background:#fbb"
| 46 || June 11 (1) || @ Giants || 5–6 || Bill Voiselle (7–7) || Ken Raffensberger (5–5) || None || see 2nd game || 20–25–1
|- style="background:#fbb"
| 47 || June 11 (2) || @ Giants || 5–6 (12) || Ace Adams (6–6) || Dick Barrett (4–8) || None || 21,526 || 20–26–1
|- style="background:#fbb"
| 48 || June 13 (1) || Braves || 1–2 || Jim Tobin (7–5) || Ken Raffensberger (5–6) || None || see 2nd game || 20–27–1
|- style="background:#bfb"
| 49 || June 13 (2) || Braves || 8–7 || Al Gerheauser (3–6) || Nate Andrews (5–5) || None || 5,382 || 21–27–1
|- style="background:#bbb"
| – || June 14 || Braves || colspan=6 | Postponed (rain); Makeup: September 1 as a traditional double-header
|- style="background:#bfb"
| 50 || June 15 || Braves || 5–4 || Ken Raffensberger (6–6) || Jim Tobin (7–6) || None || 4,568 || 22–27–1
|- style="background:#fbb"
| 51 || June 16 || Dodgers || 4–5 || Rube Melton (4–4) || Charley Schanz (5–5) || Les Webber (1) || 9,055 || 22–28–1
|- style="background:#fbb"
| 52 || June 17 || Dodgers || 3–4 || Whit Wyatt (1–3) || Bill Lee (3–2) || Hal Gregg (2) || 4,858 || 22–29–1
|- style="background:#fbb"
| 53 || June 18 (1) || Dodgers || 3–7 || Ed Head (3–0) || Ken Raffensberger (6–7) || None || see 2nd game || 22–30–1
|- style="background:#bfb"
| 54 || June 18 (2) || Dodgers || 6–2 || Al Gerheauser (4–6) || Cal McLish (2–5) || None || 17,243 || 23–30–1
|- style="background:#bbb"
| – || June 20 || @ Braves || colspan=6 | Postponed (rain); Makeup: August 25 as a traditional double-header
|- style="background:#bbb"
| – || June 21 (1) || @ Braves || colspan=6 | Postponed (rain); Makeup: June 22 as a traditional double-header
|- style="background:#bbb"
| – || June 21 (2) || @ Braves || colspan=6 | Postponed (rain); Makeup: August 26 as a traditional double-header
|- style="background:#bfb"
| 55 || June 22 (1) || @ Braves || 1–0 (15) || Charley Schanz (6–5) || Al Javery (3–9) || None || see 2nd game || 24–30–1
|- style="background:#fbb"
| 56 || June 22 (2) || @ Braves || 0–7 (5) || Jim Tobin (8–7) || Dick Barrett (4–9) || None || 2,556 || 24–31–1
|- style="background:#fbb"
| 57 || June 23 || @ Dodgers || 0–2 || Ed Head (4–0) || Ken Raffensberger (6–8) || None || 13,510 || 24–32–1
|- style="background:#fbb"
| 58 || June 24 || @ Dodgers || 3–8 || Cal McLish (3–5) || Al Gerheauser (4–7) || None || 10,431 || 24–33–1
|- style="background:#fbb"
| 59 || June 25 (1) || @ Dodgers || 1–4 || Curt Davis (4–4) || Charley Schanz (6–6) || None || see 2nd game || 24–34–1
|- style="background:#fbb"
| 60 || June 25 (2) || @ Dodgers || 1–2 (10) || Rube Melton (5–5) || Dick Barrett (4–10) || None || 13,320 || 24–35–1
|- style="background:#bfb"
| 61 || June 28 || @ Cardinals || 4–0 || Ken Raffensberger (7–8) || Max Lanier (7–5) || None || 24,782 || 25–35–1
|- style="background:#bfb"
| 62 || June 29 || @ Cardinals || 1–0 (10) || Bill Lee (4–2) || Red Munger (10–2) || None || 1,449 || 26–35–1
|- style="background:#fbb"
| 63 || June 30 || @ Cardinals || 4–8 || Mort Cooper (8–3) || Al Gerheauser (4–8) || Blix Donnelly (1) || 1,162 || 26–36–1
|-

|- style="background:#bfb"
| 64 || July 1 || @ Cubs || 4–2 || Dick Barrett (5–10) || Paul Erickson (2–4) || None || 5,738 || 27–36–1
|- style="background:#fbb"
| 65 || July 2 (1) || @ Cubs || 1–8 || Bob Chipman (6–3) || Charley Schanz (6–7) || None || see 2nd game || 27–37–1
|- style="background:#bfb"
| 66 || July 2 (2) || @ Cubs || 4–2 || Ken Raffensberger (8–8) || Hank Wyse (6–8) || None || 29,307 || 28–37–1
|- style="background:#bfb"
| 67 || July 4 (1) || @ Pirates || 3–2 || Al Gerheauser (5–8) || Rip Sewell (10–6) || Charley Schanz (2) || see 2nd game || 29–37–1
|- style="background:#fbb"
| 68 || July 4 (2) || @ Pirates || 0–4 || Max Butcher (6–5) || Bill Lee (4–3) || None || 16,285 || 29–38–1
|- style="background:#bfb"
| 69 || July 5 || @ Pirates || 12–2 || Dick Barrett (6–10) || Ray Starr (3–1) || None || 2,055 || 30–38–1
|- style="background:#fbb"
| 70 || July 6 || @ Pirates || 5–6 || Nick Strincevich (6–4) || Ken Raffensberger (8–9) || Xavier Rescigno (4) || 9,136 || 30–39–1
|- style="background:#bfb"
| 71 || July 7 || @ Reds || 3–2 || Charley Schanz (7–7) || Clyde Shoun (6–5) || None || 877 || 31–39–1
|- style="background:#bfb"
| 72 || July 8 || @ Reds || 3–2 || Bill Lee (5–3) || Jim Konstanty (3–1) || Andy Karl (1) || 1,626 || 32–39–1
|- style="background:#fbb"
| 73 || July 9 (1) || @ Reds || 5–9 || Arnold Carter (5–2) || Dick Barrett (6–11) || Bucky Walters (1) || see 2nd game || 32–40–1
|- style="background:#fbb"
| 74 || July 9 (2) || @ Reds || 5–7 || Ed Heusser (6–5) || Ken Raffensberger (8–10) || None || 10,111 || 32–41–1
|- style="background:#bbcaff;"
| – || July 11 ||colspan="7" | 1944 Major League Baseball All-Star Game at Forbes Field in Pittsburgh
|- style="background:#bbb"
| – || July 13 || Giants || colspan=6 | Postponed (rain); Makeup: July 15 as a traditional double-header
|- style="background:#fbb"
| 75 || July 14 || Giants || 1–2 || Harry Feldman (1–2) || Ken Raffensberger (8–11) || Ace Adams (9) || 11,137 || 32–42–1
|- style="background:#bfb"
| 76 || July 15 (1) || Giants || 3–1 || Bill Lee (6–3) || Bill Voiselle (11–11) || None || see 2nd game || 33–42–1
|- style="background:#fbb"
| 77 || July 15 (2) || Giants || 1–6 || Jack Brewer (1–0) || Charley Schanz (7–8) || None || 7,835 || 33–43–1
|- style="background:#bfb"
| 78 || July 16 (1) || Giants || 6–2 || Al Gerheauser (6–8) || Johnny Allen (1–1) || None || see 2nd game || 34–43–1
|- style="background:#fbb"
| 79 || July 16 (2) || Giants || 3–8 || Andy Hansen (1–2) || Dick Barrett (6–12) || Ace Adams (10) || 16,266 || 34–44–1
|- style="background:#bfb"
| 80 || July 19 || Pirates || 4–2 || Ken Raffensberger (9–11) || Nick Strincevich (6–5) || None || 7,784 || 35–44–1
|- style="background:#fbb"
| 81 || July 20 (1) || Pirates || 1–4 || Ray Starr (4–2) || Bill Lee (6–4) || None || see 2nd game || 35–45–1
|- style="background:#bfb"
| 82 || July 20 (2) || Pirates || 3–2 (11) || Charley Schanz (8–8) || Xavier Rescigno (5–7) || None || 7,309 || 36–45–1
|- style="background:#fbb"
| 83 || July 21 || Pirates || 3–5 || Max Butcher (8–5) || Al Gerheauser (6–9) || None || 8,527 || 36–46–1
|- style="background:#fbb"
| 84 || July 22 || Reds || 3–4 || Tommy de la Cruz (3–7) || Andy Karl (0–1) || None || 8,498 || 36–47–1
|- style="background:#bfb"
| 85 || July 23 (1) || Reds || 7–6 || Charley Schanz (9–8) || Harry Gumbert (7–6) || None || see 2nd game || 37–47–1
|- style="background:#fbb"
| 86 || July 23 (2) || Reds || 1–2 || Clyde Shoun (7–5) || Ken Raffensberger (9–12) || None || 16,895 || 37–48–1
|- style="background:#bbb"
| – || July 24 || Reds || colspan=6 | Postponed (rain); Makeup: September 19 as a traditional double-header
|- style="background:#fbb"
| 87 || July 25 || Cardinals || 0–9 || Al Jurisich (7–6) || Al Gerheauser (6–10) || None || 8,945 || 37–49–1
|- style="background:#fbb"
| 88 || July 26 || Cardinals || 6–8 (10) || Max Lanier (10–5) || Barney Mussill (0–1) || None || 14,863 || 37–50–1
|- style="background:#fbb"
| 89 || July 27 (1) || Cardinals || 7–8 || Harry Brecheen (9–2) || Bill Lee (6–5) || Al Jurisich (1) || see 2nd game || 37–51–1
|- style="background:#fbb"
| 90 || July 27 (2) || Cardinals || 0–5 || Mort Cooper (13–4) || Ken Raffensberger (9–13) || None || 12,871 || 37–52–1
|- style="background:#fbb"
| 91 || July 29 || Cubs || 2–4 || Claude Passeau (6–7) || Dick Barrett (6–13) || None || 6,560 || 37–53–1
|- style="background:#fbb"
| 92 || July 30 (1) || Cubs || 2–4 || Hank Wyse (10–9) || Charley Schanz (9–9) || Bob Chipman (1) || see 2nd game || 37–54–1
|- style="background:#fbb"
| 93 || July 30 (2) || Cubs || 2–11 || Bill Fleming (7–7) || Al Gerheauser (6–11) || None || 12,712 || 37–55–1
|- style="background:#fbb"
| 94 || July 31 || Cubs || 1–5 || Hy Vandenberg (4–3) || Bill Lee (6–6) || None || 4,134 || 37–56–1
|-

|- style="background:#bbb"
| – || August 1 (1) || Cubs || colspan=6 | Postponed (transportation strike); Makeup: August 2 as a traditional double-header
|- style="background:#bbb"
| – || August 1 (2) || Cubs || colspan=6 | Postponed (transportation strike); Makeup: August 2 as a traditional double-header
|- style="background:#bbb"
| – || August 2 (1) || Cubs || colspan=6 | Postponed (transportation strike); Makeup: September 25 as a traditional double-header
|- style="background:#bbb"
| – || August 2 (2) || Cubs || colspan=6 | Postponed (transportation strike); Makeup: September 26 as a traditional double-header
|- style="background:#fbb"
| 95 || August 4 || @ Giants || 3–4 (10) || Andy Hansen (3–2) || Ken Raffensberger (9–14) || None || 11,603 || 37–57–1
|- style="background:#fbb"
| 96 || August 5 || @ Giants || 5–6 || Rube Fischer (4–8) || Vern Kennedy (2–6) || Ace Adams (12) || 10,376 || 37–58–1
|- style="background:#fbb"
| 97 || August 6 (1) || @ Giants || 2–6 || Harry Feldman (9–7) || Charley Schanz (9–10) || Andy Hansen (1) || see 2nd game || 37–59–1
|- style="background:#bfb"
| 98 || August 6 (2) || @ Giants || 3–1 || Bill Lee (7–6) || Johnny Allen (2–3) || None || 15,299 || 38–59–1
|- style="background:#fbb"
| 99 || August 9 || @ Cardinals || 2–4 || Max Lanier (14–5) || Ken Raffensberger (9–15) || None || 11,547 || 38–60–1
|- style="background:#fbb"
| 100 || August 10 || @ Cardinals || 0–2 || Mort Cooper (15–5) || Al Gerheauser (6–12) || None || 5,039 || 38–61–1
|- style="background:#fbb"
| 101 || August 11 || @ Cardinals || 4–9 || Freddy Schmidt (3–1) || Charley Schanz (9–11) || None || 5,985 || 38–62–1
|- style="background:#bfb"
| 102 || August 12 || @ Cardinals || 3–0 || Dick Barrett (7–13) || Al Jurisich (7–9) || None || 5,693 || 39–62–1
|- style="background:#bfb"
| 103 || August 13 (1) || @ Cubs || 3–2 || Bill Lee (8–6) || Bob Chipman (11–7) || Andy Karl (2) || see 2nd game || 40–62–1
|- style="background:#bfb"
| 104 || August 13 (2) || @ Cubs || 7–6 || Charley Schanz (10–11) || Paul Erickson (2–7) || None || 38,567 || 41–62–1
|- style="background:#bfb"
| 105 || August 14 || @ Cubs || 6–1 || Ken Raffensberger (10–15) || Bill Fleming (8–8) || None || 3,508 || 42–62–1
|- style="background:#fbb"
| 106 || August 15 || @ Cubs || 1–4 (6) || Hy Vandenberg (5–3) || Al Gerheauser (6–13) || None || 4,605 || 42–63–1
|- style="background:#bbb"
| – || August 16 || @ Pirates || colspan=6 | Postponed (rain and wet grounds); Makeup: August 17 as a traditional double-header
|- style="background:#fbb"
| 107 || August 17 (1) || @ Pirates || 6–7 || Xavier Rescigno (8–7) || Andy Karl (0–2) || None || see 2nd game || 42–64–1
|- style="background:#fbb"
| 108 || August 17 (2) || @ Pirates || 5–6 (10) || Nick Strincevich (9–6) || Dick Barrett (7–14) || None || 3,262 || 42–65–1
|- style="background:#bfb"
| 109 || August 18 || @ Pirates || 3–2 || Ken Raffensberger (11–15) || Rip Sewell (13–10) || None || 14,566 || 43–65–1
|- style="background:#fbb"
| 110 || August 19 || @ Pirates || 3–5 || Preacher Roe (10–9) || Al Gerheauser (6–14) || None || 3,327 || 43–66–1
|- style="background:#fbb"
| 111 || August 20 (1) || @ Reds || 1–2 (12) || Bucky Walters (18–6) || Vern Kennedy (2–7) || None || see 2nd game || 43–67–1
|- style="background:#bfb"
| 112 || August 20 (2) || @ Reds || 4–1 || Charley Schanz (11–11) || Arnold Carter (7–6) || None || 10,595 || 44–67–1
|- style="background:#bfb"
| 113 || August 22 (1) || @ Reds || 4–3 || Bill Lee (9–6) || Clyde Shoun (9–7) || None || see 2nd game || 45–67–1
|- style="background:#fbb"
| 114 || August 22 (2) || @ Reds || 1–5 || Tommy de la Cruz (6–7) || Dick Barrett (7–15) || None || 9,262 || 45–68–1
|- style="background:#bfb"
| 115 || August 25 (1) || @ Braves || 9–7 || Dick Barrett (8–15) || Jim Tobin (13–16) || None || see 2nd game || 46–68–1
|- style="background:#fbb"
| 116 || August 25 (2) || @ Braves || 3–4 || Nate Andrews (13–11) || Charley Schanz (11–12) || None || 2,483 || 46–69–1
|- style="background:#bfb"
| 117 || August 26 (1) || @ Braves || 3–0 || Al Gerheauser (7–14) || Jim Tobin (13–17) || None || see 2nd game || 47–69–1
|- style="background:#fbb"
| 118 || August 26 (2) || @ Braves || 2–3 || Johnny Hutchings (1–2) || Vern Kennedy (2–8) || None || 3,076 || 47–70–1
|- style="background:#bfb"
| 119 || August 27 (1) || @ Braves || 8–5 || Dick Barrett (9–15) || Al Javery (5–17) || Charley Schanz (3) || see 2nd game || 48–70–1
|- style="background:#fbb"
| 120 || August 27 (2) || @ Braves || 4–5 (10) || Al Javery (6–17) || Bill Lee (9–7) || None || 7,578 || 48–71–1
|- style="background:#fbb"
| 121 || August 29 || @ Dodgers || 1–2 || Hal Gregg (8–14) || Charley Schanz (11–13) || None || 1,974 || 48–72–1
|- style="background:#fbb"
| 122 || August 30 || @ Dodgers || 2–10 || Ben Chapman (2–1) || Ken Raffensberger (11–16) || None || 11,537 || 48–73–1
|-

|- style="background:#fbb"
| 123 || September 1 (1) || Braves || 2–3 (10) || Ira Hutchinson (8–6) || Al Gerheauser (7–15) || None || see 2nd game || 48–74–1
|- style="background:#fbb"
| 124 || September 1 (2) || Braves || 4–7 || Al Javery (7–17) || Vern Kennedy (2–9) || Nate Andrews (2) || 4,191 || 48–75–1
|- style="background:#fbb"
| 125 || September 2 || Braves || 1–2 (13) || Ira Hutchinson (9–6) || Bill Lee (9–8) || None || 3,905 || 48–76–1
|- style="background:#fbb"
| 126 || September 3 (1) || Braves || 1–2 || Jim Tobin (15–17) || Dick Barrett (9–16) || None || see 2nd game || 48–77–1
|- style="background:#bfb"
| 127 || September 3 (2) || Braves || 5–0 || Charley Schanz (12–13) || Ben Cardoni (0–6) || None || 10,737 || 49–77–1
|- style="background:#fbb"
| 128 || September 4 (1) || Giants || 0–7 || Harry Feldman (11–10) || Ken Raffensberger (11–17) || None || see 2nd game || 49–78–1
|- style="background:#bfb"
| 129 || September 4 (2) || Giants || 14–8 || Andy Karl (1–2) || Rube Fischer (4–13) || None || 12,651 || 50–78–1
|- style="background:#bfb"
| 130 || September 7 || Dodgers || 7–5 || Andy Karl (2–2) || Art Herring (2–3) || None || 3,566 || 51–78–1
|- style="background:#fbb"
| 131 || September 8 || Dodgers || 3–4 || Les Webber (6–8) || Ken Raffensberger (11–18) || None || 3,261 || 51–79–1
|- style="background:#fbb"
| 132 || September 10 (1) || Dodgers || 4–8 || Tom Sunkel (1–3) || Bill Lee (9–9) || Les Webber (3) || see 2nd game || 51–80–1
|- style="background:#bfb"
| 133 || September 10 (2) || Dodgers || 3–2 || Dick Barrett (10–16) || Ben Chapman (3–2) || None || 10,500 || 52–80–1
|- style="background:#bbb"
| – || September 12 (1) || @ Giants || colspan=6 | Postponed (rain); Makeup: September 13 as a traditional double-header
|- style="background:#bbb"
| – || September 12 (2) || @ Giants || colspan=6 | Postponed (rain); Makeup: September 16 in Philadelphia as a traditional double-header
|- style="background:#bbb"
| – || September 13 (1) || @ Giants || colspan=6 | Postponed (rain); Makeup: September 14 as a traditional double-header
|- style="background:#bbb"
| – || September 13 (2) || @ Giants || colspan=6 | Postponed (rain); Makeup: September 14 as a traditional double-header
|- style="background:#fbb"
| 134 || September 14 (1) || @ Giants || 1–12 || Bill Voiselle (20–15) || Charley Schanz (12–14) || None || 1,668 || 52–81–1
|- style="background:#bbb"
| – || September 14 (2) || @ Giants || colspan=6 | Postponed (rain; 1944 Great Atlantic hurricane); Makeup: September 17 in Philadelphia as a traditional double-header
|- style="background:#bfb"
| 135 || September 15 || Giants || 7–3 || Ken Raffensberger (12–18) || Harry Feldman (11–12) || None || 3,210 || 53–81–1
|- style="background:#bfb"
| 136 || September 16 (1) || Giants || 5–2 || Dick Barrett (11–16) || Johnny Allen (4–6) || None || see 2nd game || 54–81–1
|- style="background:#bfb"
| 137 || September 16 (2) || Giants || 2–1 (10) || Al Gerheauser (8–15) || Ewald Pyle (7–8) || None || 3,993 || 55–81–1
|- style="background:#bfb"
| 138 || September 17 (1) || Giants || 7–0 || Bill Lee (10–9) || Cliff Melton (2–1) || None || see 2nd game || 56–81–1
|- style="background:#bfb"
| 139 || September 17 (2) || Giants || 5–4 || Andy Karl (3–2) || Jack Brewer (1–4) || None || 9,309 || 57–81–1
|- style="background:#bbb"
| – || September 19 (1) || Reds || colspan=6 | Postponed (rain); Makeup: September 20 as a traditional double-header
|- style="background:#bbb"
| – || September 19 (2) || Reds || colspan=6 | Postponed (rain); Makeup: September 21 as a traditional double-header
|- style="background:#bfb"
| 140 || September 20 (1) || Reds || 3–2 || Charley Schanz (13–14) || Ed Heusser (13–9) || None || see 2nd game || 58–81–1
|- style="background:#fbb"
| 141 || September 20 (2) || Reds || 4–6 || Bucky Walters (22–8) || Ken Raffensberger (12–19) || None || 4,161 || 58–82–1
|- style="background:#fbb"
| 142 || September 21 (1) || Reds || 3–5 (12) || Harry Gumbert (13–9) || Vern Kennedy (2–10) || None || see 2nd game || 58–83–1
|- style="background:#fbb"
| 143 || September 21 (2) || Reds || 4–8 || Tommy de la Cruz (8–9) || Dick Barrett (11–17) || Arnold Carter (2) || 3,191 || 58–84–1
|- style="background:#fbb"
| 144 || September 23 || Cardinals || 2–6 || Bud Byerly (2–1) || Bill Lee (10–10) || None || 3,341 || 58–85–1
|- style="background:#fbb"
| 145 || September 24 (1) || Cardinals || 3–4 (16) || Mort Cooper (22–7) || Ken Raffensberger (12–20) || None || see 2nd game || 58–86–1
|- style="background:#fbb"
| 146 || September 24 (2) || Cardinals || 0–1 || Ted Wilks (17–3) || Charley Schanz (13–15) || None || 13,480 || 58–87–1
|- style="background:#fbb"
| 147 || September 25 (1) || Cubs || 6–7 (10 || Hy Vandenberg (7–4) || Chet Covington (1–1) || None || see 2nd game || 58–88–1
|- style="background:#fbb"
| 148 || September 25 (2) || Cubs || 1–4 || Claude Passeau (15–9) || Dick Barrett (11–18) || None || 1,611 || 58–89–1
|- style="background:#fbb"
| 149 || September 26 (1) || Cubs || 0–15 || Hank Wyse (15–15) || Al Gerheauser (8–16) || None || see 2nd game || 58–90–1
|- style="background:#bfb"
| 150 || September 26 (2) || Cubs || 10–1 || Vern Kennedy (3–10) || Bob Chipman (12–10) || None || 1,700 || 59–90–1
|- style="background:#fbb"
| 151 || September 27 || Cubs || 3–5 (11) || Red Lynn (5–3) || Bill Lee (10–11) || None || 1,033 || 59–91–1
|- style="background:#bfb"
| 152 || September 29 || Pirates || 3–0 || Ken Raffensberger (13–20) || Fritz Ostermueller (13–8) || None || 1,000 || 60–91–1
|- style="background:#bbb"
| – || September 30 || Pirates || colspan=6 | Cancelled (rain)
|-

|- style="background:#fbb"
| 153 || October 1 (1) || Pirates || 1–9 || Rip Sewell (21–12) || Charley Schanz (13–16) || None || see 2nd game || 60–92–1
|- style="background:#bfb"
| 154 || October 1 (2) || Pirates || 7–1 || Dick Barrett (12–18) || Len Gilmore (0–1) || None || 6,492 || 61–92–1
|-

| style="text-align:left;" |
The second game on April 30, 1944, ended due to the Pennsylvania Sunday curfew after nine innings with the score tied 2–2, and an additional game was played on June 13.
The game on May 16, 1944, was suspended (mutual consent between managers to allow the Phillies to catch a train to Cincinnati) after seven innings with the score 6–4 and was completed June 28 with different umpires.
The second game on May 21, 1944, was suspended (Sunday curfew) after eight innings with the score 9–4 and was completed July 5.
The original schedule indicated single games on June 12, 14, and 15 with Boston; the June 12 game was moved to June 13 (originally an off-day) and combined with a makeup game (due to the April 30 tie game).
The original schedule indicated single games on June 19, 20, 21, and 22 at Boston; the June 19 game was moved to June 21 (as a double-header) and ultimately to June 22 (as a double-header).
The second game on July 16, 1944, was suspended (Sunday curfew) after eight innings with the score 3–6 and was completed September 15.
The original schedule indicated a single games on July 27 and 28 with St. Louis; it was moved to July 27 (as a double-header).
Contemporary newspaper accounts indicate that the Phillies finished the August 4 game under protest. Neither Baseball-Reference nor Retrosheet indicates an official protest.
The original schedule indicated a single game on September 9 with Brooklyn; it was moved to September 8 (originally an off-day).
The original schedule indicated a single games on September 28, 29, 30, and October 1 with Pittsburgh; variations included double-headers on September 28 and October 1 (with off days in between). The schedule was revised for single games on September 29 and 30 with a double-header on October 1.

Roster

Player stats

Batting

Starters by position 
Note: Pos = Position; G = Games played; AB = At bats; H = Hits; Avg. = Batting average; HR = Home runs; RBI = Runs batted in

Other batters 
Note: G = Games played; AB = At bats; H = Hits; Avg. = Batting average; HR = Home runs; RBI = Runs batted in

Pitching

Starting pitchers 
Note: G = Games pitched; IP = Innings pitched; W = Wins; L = Losses; ERA = Earned run average; SO = Strikeouts

Other pitchers 
Note: G = Games pitched; IP = Innings pitched; W = Wins; L = Losses; ERA = Earned run average; SO = Strikeouts

Relief pitchers 
Note: G = Games pitched; W = Wins; L = Losses; SV = Saves; ERA = Earned run average; SO = Strikeouts

Farm system

References

External links
1944 Philadelphia Phillies season at Baseball Reference

Philadelphia Phillies seasons
Philadelphia Phillies season
Philadelphia